Hendler is a surname. Notable people with the surname include:

Daniel Hendler (born 1976), Uruguayan actor
Herb Hendler (1918–2007), American record producer and lyricist
James Hendler (born 1957), American artificial intelligence researcher
Lauri Hendler, actor in Gimme a Break!
Maxwell Hendler (born 1938), American painter
Raymond Hendler (1923–1998), American artist
Richard Hendler, American lawyer and professor
Sheldon Saul Hendler (1936–2012), American scientist, physician and musician
Stewart Hendler (born 1978), American director
Talma Hendler (born 1955), Israeli psychiatrist
Tamaryn Hendler (born 1992), Belgian tennis player

See also
Handler (disambiguation)
Cable Bridge (Ed Hendler Bridge)
Hendler Creamery, historic industrial complex in Jonestown, Baltimore, Maryland
Hendler v. United States, case of the U.S. Court of Appeals for the Federal Circuit